The Swimming Hour is Andrew Bird's third album with Andrew Bird's Bowl of Fire. It comprises a blend of musical styles from the 20th century including jazz, gospel, rock, classical, Latin and folk, often accompanied by thoughtful, playful or haunting vocals and lyrics.

Track listing

Other appearances

 Live versions of "Why" and "How Indiscreet" are found on the album Fingerlings.

Andrew Bird albums
2001 albums
Rykodisc albums